The church of Our Lady of Mount Carmel and St Simon Stock is a Roman Catholic church at 41 Kensington Church Street, Kensington, London W8, served by Discalced Carmelites.

It is a Grade II listed building, built in 1954 to 1959, and designed by Sir Giles Gilbert Scott.

The Carmelite Priory next door is also a Grade II listed building, built in 1886 to 1889 by Goldie, Child and Goldie.

References

External links

Roman Catholic churches in the Royal Borough of Kensington and Chelsea
Grade II listed churches in the Royal Borough of Kensington and Chelsea
Our Lady
20th-century Roman Catholic church buildings in the United Kingdom
Discalced Carmelite Order in the United Kingdom
Churches in the Roman Catholic Diocese of Westminster